Noel Mannion (born 12 January 1963 in Ballinasloe, Ireland) is a former Irish rugby union international player who played for the Irish national rugby union team. He played as a number eight.
He played for the Ireland team from 1988 to 1993, winning 16 caps and scoring 3 tries, after making his debut in October 1988 against Samoa in a 49–22 win at Lansdowne Road. 
He was part of the Ireland team at the 1991 Rugby World Cup.

References

External links

1963 births
Living people
Irish rugby union players
Ireland international rugby union players
Connacht Rugby players
People educated at Garbally College
Rugby union players from County Galway
Rugby union number eights